The U-boat War Badge was a German war badge that was awarded to U-boat crew members during World War I and World War II.

History
The U-boat War Badge was originally instituted during the First World War on February 1, 1918. It was awarded to recognize U-boat crews who had completed three war patrols. The badge was worn on the lower left side of the uniform and was oval shaped resembling a wreath of laurel leaves. A submarine lay across the center and the German State Crown (Reichskrone) was inlaid at the top center of the wreath.

On October 13, 1939, the U-boat War Badge was reinstituted. It was very similar to the original badge with the exception of the imperial crown being replaced with a German Eagle above a swastika, and a more modernized submarine now facing towards the left was used. The new version was first made of bronze metal, with later ones made of zinc with a "gold wash".

Classes

The award was bestowed in two classes:

U-Boat War Badge
There were several ways to be awarded this medal. The most common would be the completion of two or more war patrols. Although the completion of two war patrols might seem a lowly requirement, but a typical U-boat war cruise would often run into months at a time. Completing two war patrols could be equally dangerous as the U-boat has to endure constant attacks by Allied aircraft and warships. The other occasion when this badge was awarded was having been wounded during a patrol or killed in action.

U-boat War Badge with Diamonds
The U-boat War Badge with Diamonds was instituted by Großadmiral Karl Dönitz after he had received from Grand Admiral Erich Raeder a special solid gold version of the U-boat War Badge in which the wreath as well as the swastika were inlaid with diamonds.

The badge was a special issue award given to U-boat commanders who had received the Knight's Cross of the Iron Cross with Oak Leaves. This version was made of gold plate over silver. Manufactured by the firms Schwerin u. Sohn and Gebr. Godet & Co. It was the same as the basic pattern but with nine small diamonds inlaid in the swastika. This award was more of a personal award by Dönitz. Approximately 30 were awarded, including the original one to Admiral Dönitz.

Recipients of the U-boat War badge with Diamonds

 Albrecht Brandi
 Heinrich Bleichrodt
 Otto von Bülow
 Karl Dönitz
 Carl Emmermann
 Engelbert Endrass
 Friedrich Guggenberger
 Robert Gysae
 Reinhard Hardegen
 Werner Hartmann
 Werner Henke
 Otto Kretschmer
 Hans-Günther Lange
 Georg Lassen
 Heinrich Lehmann-Willenbrock
 Heinrich Liebe
 Wolfgang Lüth
 Johann Mohr
 Rolf Mützelburg
 Karl-Friedrich Merten
 Gunther Prien
 Joachim Schepke
 Adalbert Schnee
 Klaus Scholtz
 Viktor Schütze
 Herbert Schultze
 Reinhard Suhren
 Rolf Thomsen
 Erich Topp

Notes

References 
 
 

Military awards and decorations of Nazi Germany
Awards established in 1939
Military awards and decorations of Imperial Germany
U-boats
Awards established in 1918
1918 establishments in Germany
1939 establishments in Germany